Harry Köcher (16 February 1933 – 2003) was a German sports shooter. He competed in two events at the 1964 Summer Olympics.

References

1933 births
2003 deaths
German male sport shooters
Olympic shooters of the United Team of Germany
Shooters at the 1964 Summer Olympics
Sportspeople from Thuringia
People from Saale-Orla-Kreis